Crystal Meth Anonymous (CMA) is a California-based non-profit, public-benefit corporation founded in 1994. The members of the fellowship of Crystal Meth Anonymous work a twelve-step program of recovery with recovering crystal meth addicts. Participants in local groups meet in order to help others recover from methamphetamine addiction. CMA advocates complete abstinence from methamphetamine, alcohol, inhalants, and all other psychoactive drugs not taken as prescribed.

History and demographics 
CMA was founded on September 16, 1994 in West Hollywood, California by Bill Coffey, a member of the 12 step recovery community in Los Angeles for over two decades at the time. The first group held its first meeting at the West Hollywood Alcohol and Drug Center. , CMA had a presence in over 100 metropolitan areas of the United States, as well as parts of the United Kingdom, Canada, Australia, and Iran. The first CMA World Service Conference was held in Park City, Utah in October 2008, during which the CMA Conference Charter was adopted. The purpose of the conference is to bring together elected delegates from CMA groups from across the world to meet as guardians of the world services and of the Twelve Steps and Twelve Traditions of CMA, the same Twelve Steps and Twelve Traditions followed by Alcoholics Anonymous. The conference does not act as a governing body of CMA, but rather as the service body for the organization.

At the first General Service Conference, the delegates adopted that:The Fellowship of Crystal Meth Anonymous works a Twelve Step program of recovery. We have not felt the need to elaborate in great detail a specific CMA approach to the Twelve Steps: too many other excellent outlines already exist for following these spiritual principles. But our experience has shown that without the Steps we could not stay sober.

In 2002, the U.S. Department of Health and Human Services estimated 12 million people, age 12 and over, had used methamphetamine—600,000 of which were estimated to be current users—with a growth rate of approximately 300,000 new users per year. In 2005, a Los Angeles clinic estimated that one out of three gay or bisexual HIV-positive men admitted to using methamphetamine. Methamphetamine lowers a user's inhibitions, increasing the likelihood of engaging in unprotected sex and sharing needles. In large metropolitan areas, such as Atlanta, Chicago, Miami and Washington, D.C., many CMA groups are designated as gay, or are  gay. As CMA's popularity grew, the growth of meetings spread to large non-gay communities such as those in Phoenix and Minneapolis.

Effectiveness 

A self-selected study limited to men who had sex with other men, used meth, and attended CMA, showed that, after three months of participation in CMA, participants reported their number of sexual partners had fallen from seven to less than one, and self-reports of unprotected anal intercourse when using methamphetamine fell by two-thirds. In a six-month follow-up, 20% had used it again once and 64% had remained abstinent.

Literature

See also 
 Addiction recovery groups
 List of twelve-step groups
 Think you may have a problem with crystal meth? Call the CMA Helpline at: (855) METH-FREE  (638-4373)

References

Further reading

External links 
Crystal Meth Anonymous website
Think you may have a problem with crystal meth? Call the CMA Helpline at: (855) METH-FREE  (638-4373)

Methamphetamine in the United States
Addiction organizations in the United States
Twelve-step programs
Mental health organizations in California